Flamands is a quartier of Saint Barthélemy in the Caribbean. It is located in the northwestern part of the island.

Populated places in Saint Barthélemy
Quartiers of Saint Barthélemy